Pedo is a given name and surname. Notable people with the name include:

Pedo Terlaje (born 1946), politician in Guam
Albinovanus Pedo, 1st century Roman poet 
Gaius Popilius Carus Pedo, 2nd century Roman senator 
Marcus Pedo Vergilianus, 2nd century Roman senator